Tom Cotter (born June 29, 1972) is an American conservationist, entrepreneur, renewable energy advocate, and ordained evangelical minister living in Clovis, California.

Biography

Early life and inspiration
Tom Cotter grew up in Napa Valley, California, United States. A significant influence of his work was the Boy Scouts of America. In 1988, Cotter was awarded the title of Eagle Scout.

Professional career
In 1997, he was ordained clergy at First Christian Church in Napa, California. He served as a pastor at Clovis Christian Church in Clovis, California, from 1996 to 2006.

From 2006 to 2015, Cotter worked in sales leadership in the U.S. Photovoltaic Industry, starting at ReGrid Power, which was later acquired by Real Goods Solar. He also worked at Sunrun.
 
From 2015 to 2017, he worked as Regional Sales Manager at Renew Financial for the California counties of Fresno, Madera, Tulare, and Kings.

Cotter has taught as an adjunct professor of Theological Ethics and the Environment at Fresno Pacific University.

Personal life
Cotter resides in Clovis, California, with his wife, Christi Gaither, and their three children. The family has a solar power and solar thermal system on their home. Mr. Cotter drives a  Nissan Leaf. Mrs. Cotter drives an alternative fuel VW Jetta TDI. The Cotter family uses vermiposting to turn kitchen scraps, junk mail and paper packing materials into nutrient rich soil for their garden and yard.

Cotter is a part of the California Climate Ride, a 320-mile bicycle benefit ride for bicycle advocacy and renewable energy down the coast of California from Eureka, California to San Francisco, California.

Sustainability education and advocacy

Community

In 2007, Cotter and Socient CEO, Victor Ramayrat, co-founded Green Fresno, a free online community and information portal (in 2012 it was relaunched as Green Central Valley).

Cotter is the organizer and curator of the annual Fresno Solar Tour part of the American Solar Energy Society's National Solar Tour.

Cotter is an Organizer of Fresno Earth Day, purposed to inspire and mobilize individuals and organizations to demonstrate their commitment to environmental protection and sustainability.

Cotter is founder and coordinator of Fresno Green Drinks, an informal monthly gathering of environmental field professionals, educators, public servants, activists, and people wanting to learn and inspire each other towards broader ecological stewardship in the Fresno metro area. As of May 2012, Green Drinks was active in 642 cities worldwide.

In 2012, Cotter became a Climate Leader in the Climate Leadership Corps with the Climate Reality Project.

Cotter served as a Technical Advisory Committee Member for Energize Fresno in the Private Business, Development, and Finance Sector in 2017.

Board of directors
Cotter serves on the Board of Directors of the Solar Living Institute.

Cotter is the past president and chairman of the board of directors at the International Green Industry Hall of Fame, which promotes ecological sustainability worldwide through recognizing individuals and organizations for outstanding achievement(s) in the Green Industry and provides an educational forum for the international public.

Cotter is a past member of the board of directors at Restore Hetch Hetchy.

Film

Cotter is a producer of the short documentary film, Forest Man. The film chronicles the story of Jadav Payeng, an Indian man who single-handedly planted nearly 1,400 acres of forest to save his island, Majuli, India. The film is directed by William D. McMaster of Toronto, Ontario, Canada. The film was released in the summer, 2013.

Political
In 2010, Cotter worked with California's No on Prop 23 Campaign. This proposition would have suspended AB 32, a law enacted in 2006 legally referred to as the Global Warming Solutions Act of 2006. Prop 23 was defeated by California voters during the statewide election by a 23% margin.

In 2012, Cotter worked to get the California Public Utilities Commission (CPUC) to expand net metering in California. 

In 2012, Cotter worked to get the passing of Proposition 39 - California Clean Energy Jobs Act.

References 

1972 births
Living people
People from Clovis, California
People from Napa County, California
People associated with renewable energy
Green thinkers
Christianity and environmentalism
21st-century Protestant religious leaders
Renewable energy in the United States
American motivational speakers
Activists from California
American conservationists
Tom